Focus on form (FonF) is an approach to language education in which learners are made aware of the grammatical form of language features that they are already able to use communicatively. It is contrasted with focus on forms, which is limited solely to the explicit focus on language features, and focus on meaning, which is limited to focus on meaning with no attention paid to form at all. For a teaching intervention to qualify as focus on form and not as focus on forms, the learner must be aware of the meaning and use of the language features before the form is brought to their attention. Focus on form was proposed by Michael Long in 1988.

Background 
The FonF (focus on form) model of practice introduced by Bahari (2019a) was prepared and contextualized
based on the effectiveness of FonF-based instruction for its potential for incidental and preplanned L2 learning
(Bahari, 2018a; Fredricks, Blumenfeld, & Paris, 2004; Nassaji, 1999, 2016; Nassaji & Fotos, 2007, 2011; Williams,
2005). The FonF practice model has proved effective in catering for learners’ nonlinear and dynamic motivational
factors at individual level and taking advantage of the CALL affordances towards developing listening and speaking
skills (Bahari, 2019a). In keeping with Nassaji and Fotos (2011) the FonF is considered as an optimal approach for
learning which aims at mixing the best features of classroom L2 learning with computer-assisted L2 learning by
using CALL tools and applications to facilitate L2 learning process. In contrast to previous L2 learning practice
models sharing the feature of generality at group level, the FonF practice model addresses the nonlinearity and
dynamicity of individual differences during learning process (Bahari, 2018a). This is in response to the call for
integrating complex dynamic systems perspective (Larsen-Freeman & Cameron, 2008) towards implementing
interactive-collaborative CALL environment. Under the FonF practice model, on the one hand, form, meaning
and communication are addressed as critical learning components and on the other hand, individual learner’s
motivation is catered to by selecting learning materials with respect to the nonlinearity and dynamicity of individual
learners (Dörnyei & Ottó, 1998) in a systematic but flexible framework.

The concept of focus on form was motivated by the lack of support for the efficacy of focus on forms on the one hand, and clear advantages demonstrated by instructed language learning over uninstructed learning on the other. The research conflicting with focus on forms has been wide-ranging; learners typically acquire language features in sequences, not all at once, and most of the stages the learners' interlanguages pass through will exhibit non-native-like language forms. Furthermore, the progression of these stages is not clean; learners may use language features correctly in some situations but not in others, or they may exhibit U-shaped learning, in which native-like use may temporarily revert to non-native-like use. None of these findings sit well with the idea that students will learn exactly what you teach them, when you teach it. 

In a review of the literature comparing instructed with uninstructed language learning, Long found a clear advantage for instructed learning in both the rate of learning and the ultimate level reached. An important finding that supported Long's view came from French language immersion programs in Canada; even after students had years of meaning-focused lessons filled with comprehensible input, their spoken language remained far from native-like, with many grammatical errors. This is despite the fact that they could speak fluently and had native-like listening abilities.

Notes

References 

 

 

 
 
 

 

 

 
Language-teaching methodology
Second-language acquisition